Notabax monteithi is a species of beetle in the family Carabidae, the only species in the genus Notabax.

References

Pterostichinae